Comedy Central is the Arabic-language version of Comedy Central. It was launched on May 7, 2016. The channel shows international and local shows. It is under license from Paramount Networks EMEAA and broadcasts exclusively on OSN.

Content

Local shows
Some of the local shows:
Block 13
Comedy Al-Wagef
Menna W Fina
Ridiculousness Arabia
Comedians Solve World Problems - Arabia
Bad Snappers
Comedians In Quarantine

International shows
Arabian Comedy Central also airs shows from Comedy Central such as:
The Daily Show
Impractical Jokers
Roast Battle
Lip Sync Battle
Catch a Contractor
Friends
Comedy Central Roast
Hungry Investors
Tosh.0
South Park
Comedians Solve World Problems
Jeff Ross Presents Roast Battle
Martha & Snoop's Potluck Dinner Party
Workaholics
Awkward
Wanda Sykes: Tongue Untied
Real Husbands of Hollywood
Takeshi's Castle
Friendzone
Disaster Date
Inside Amy Schumer
Nathan for You
Falcon Dash

References

External links 
 

Comedy Central
Television channels and stations established in 2016
Arabic-language television stations